Annette Jane Dobson  (born 4 September 1945) is a Professor of Biostatistics in the University of Queensland's Centre for Longitudinal and Life Course Research (CLLR) in the School of Public Health. At her institution, she is the Head of teaching programs and a Management Executive in the Management Committee. Dobson was Director of the Australian Longitudinal Study on Women's Health from 1995 to 2013. She is a highly cited publication author, a book author, and has received an Australia Day award.

Qualification 
Dobson earned a Bachelor of Science degree from the University of Adelaide in 1966. Moving on to the James Cook University, she completed a Master of Science in 1970 and a PhD (Doctor of Philosophy) in 1974. She was recognised as an Accredited Statistician in 1998 by the Statistical Society of Australia, and received a Graduate Certificate of Management in 2001 from the University of New England (Australia).

Research interests 
Her research interests lie in the fields of biostatistics, epidemiology, longitudinal studies, and social determinants of health. In biostatistics, she is specifically interested in generalized linear modeling, clinical biostatistics, and statistical methods in longitudinal studies. Dobson's topics in epidemiology include tobacco control, diabetes, cardiovascular disease, obesity and health care service use.

Positions 
Dobson is the founding Director of the Australian Longitudinal Study on Women's Health (ALSWH). and director of the Centre for Longitudinal and Life Course Research.

She was the inaugural chair of the BCA Master of Biostatistics at its inception in 2000.

Awards 
Dobson was made a Member of the Order of Australia in 2010 for her service to public health and biostatistics as a research and academic, particularly through the collection and analysis of data relating to cardiovascular disease and women's and veterans' health, which provided a basis for public health interventions and policies to reduce disease burden in the population.

Dobson won the Sidney Sax medal in 2003, the pre-eminent prize awarded by the Public Health Association of Australia.  Dobson received the 2012 Moyal Medal for her contributions to statistics and in 2015 she was elected Fellow of the Australian Academy of Health and Medical Sciences (FAHMS).

She is also an elected member of the International Statistical Institute.

An introduction to GLM 
She wrote the book An introduction to generalized linear models,  which, with over 3,000 citations, is one of the most influential and highly used books on that topic.  It is used extensively by both researchers and students with a wide range of backgrounds, such as mathematics, social sciences, and business, as reviews on Amazon show.

Most highly cited publications 
Kuulasmaa K, Tunstall-Pedoe H, Dobson A, Fortmann S, Sans S, Tolonen H, Evans A, Ferrario M, Tuomilehto J. Estimation of contribution of changes in classic risk factors to trends in coronary-event rates across the WHO MONICA Project populations.
Brown WJ, Bryson L, Byles JE, Dobson AJ, Lee C, Mishra G, Schofield M. Women's Health Australia: Recruitment for a national longitudinal cohort study.

References

External links

 Annette Dobson page at Queensland University

1945 births
Living people
Members of the Order of Australia
Academic staff of the University of Queensland
Women statisticians
Australian statisticians
Elected Members of the International Statistical Institute
Fellows of the Australian Academy of Health and Medical Sciences
20th-century Australian mathematicians
21st-century Australian mathematicians
Australian women mathematicians
20th-century women mathematicians
21st-century women mathematicians
20th-century Australian women scientists